Vail Resorts, Inc. is an American mountain resort company headquartered in Broomfield, Colorado. The company is divided into three divisions. The mountain segment owns and operates 40 mountain resorts in four countries, Vail Resorts Hospitality owns or manages hotels, lodging, condominiums and golf courses, and the Vail Resorts Development Company oversees property development and real estate holdings.

History
Vail Resorts was founded as Vail Associates Ltd. by Pete Seibert and Earl Eaton in the early 1960s. Eaton, a lifelong resident, led Siebert (a former WWII 10th Mountain Division ski trooper) to the area in March 1957.  They both became ski patrol guides at Aspen, Colorado, when they shared their dream of finding the "next great ski mountain." Siebert set off to secure financing and Eaton engineered the early lifts. Their Vail ski resort opened in 1962. George N. Gillett Jr. purchased Vail Associates in 1985. Vail Associates changed its name to Vail Resorts and went public in 1997 after Gillett Holdings went bankrupt. Apollo Management, headed by Leon Black, bought the company out of bankruptcy and took Vail Resorts public, controlling Vail Resorts until 2003, when Apollo divested itself of controlling interest. The skating rink at Beaver Creek, Colorado, was named the Black Family Skating Rink after Leon Black.

Rob Katz, a former executive at Apollo, ran Vail Resorts as CEO until November 2021, when he was appointed executive chairperson of the board. Kirsten Lynch, the company's former chief marketing officer, then took over as CEO.

Criticism
Some of Vail Resort's acquisitions have fueled anger among local residents. Locals complain that the Vail's pass structure caters to wealthy international pass holders and reduces access to nearby residents; additionally, residents have seen their cost-of-living increase following Vail's takeovers.

RockResorts
In 2001, Vail Resorts acquired the luxury hotel chain RockResorts, which contributed substantially to their brand recognition. RockResorts was named after its original owners, the Rockefeller Family. As of January 2017, the properties include:

Subsidiaries and affiliates
All of the company's retail operations are run by a smaller company, [Vail Resorts Retail, VRR], of which Vail owns 70%. The owners of the other 30% are the Gart Brothers, specifically Tom Gart, Ken Gart and John Gart. The Gart family have been in the sporting goods business for 3 generations and were the former owners of Gart Sports, the large chain of sporting goods stores in the western US. Gart Sports was sold by the Gart family in the 1990s and then recently sold again to Sports Authority, which discontinued the use of the Gart Sports name in 2006. In 2010, Vail completed the buyout of the Specialty Sports Venture brand and is now the 100% owner of all SSV operations. In addition to all of the ski shops in the Vail Resorts portfolio of ski areas, the SSV chain of stores includes Bicycle Village in Denver, Colorado Ski & Golf, Boulder Ski Deals, Aspen Sports, Telluride Sports and Mountain Sports Outlet in Summit County and Glenwood Springs and many others. SSV is reportedly the largest Trek bicycles dealer in the world.

Vail Resorts also owns just over 50% of Slifer Smith and Frampton (SSF), the largest real estate brokerage company in the Vail region, controlling over 70% of the real estate transactions in the market. Slifer, Smith and Frampton was called Slifer, Smith and Frampton/Vail Associates Real Estate, but they dropped the "Vail Associates" name in 2003. The founders of SSF are Rod Slifer, a former ski instructor who was recently the mayor of the Town of Vail, Mark Smith, a real estate broker/turned developer who currently also runs East West Partners with Harry Frampton, who was the former President of Vail Associates and currently owns East West Partners. East West Partners has built most of the large building that make up the Beaver Creek Village, including the Marketplace Building, Village Hall and One Beaver Creek. Not to be confused with East West Resorts, a separate property Management Group.

Vail Resorts Development Company (VRDC) is the wholly owned real estate development company that Vail Resorts uses to develop all of its company-owned real estate, other than the projects that East West Partners develops. VRDC developed Bachelor's Gulch, one of the most upscale, ski-in/ski-out resorts in the business with its own Ritz Carlton and just over 100 slopeside mansions. President Gerald Ford kept his ski house in the Strawberry Park section of Beaver Creek, which is between Beaver Creek and Bachelor's Gulch. Arrowhead is the third "peak" in the heavily promoted "village to village ski experience" in which you can ski from Beaver Creek to Bachelor's Gulch to Arrowhead and back again. Arrowhead was a separate ski area unrelated to Beaver Creek for years before they were finally bought by Vail Associates in the early 1990s. VRDC also developed "club" division of Vail Resorts, including the Beaver Creek Club, the Arrowhead Alpine Club,  and Game Creek Club (in Vail). All of these clubs are now operated by the "Mountain Division" of Vail Resorts.

List of resorts
Vail Resorts operates 41 ski resorts in the United States, Canada, Australia and Switzerland including, notably, the Vail, Beaver Creek, Breckenridge, Keystone, and Crested Butte ski areas in Colorado, and Northstar California, Kirkwood Mountain Resort, and Heavenly Mountain Resort on the California-Nevada border. They also acquired the largest ski resort in North America: Whistler Blackcomb, located in British Columbia, Canada. Vail Resorts offers a variety of multi-resort season passes under the Epic Pass program. The Epic Pass also has partnerships that allows access to several other resorts in the US, Canada, Japan, France, Switzerland, Austria, and Italy. Vail Resorts acquired the Grand Teton Lodge Company within the Grand Teton National Park in Wyoming in 1999. The GTLC properties include the Jenny Lake Lodge, Jackson Lake Lodge, and Colter Bay Village.

References

External links

 
Companies based in Broomfield, Colorado
Ski areas and resorts in Colorado
Economy of the Southwestern United States
Companies listed on the New York Stock Exchange
Hospitality companies established in 1962
Hospitality companies of the United States
1997 establishments in Colorado
1997 initial public offerings
Resorts in Colorado
Ski areas and resorts